The University of Galway Students' Union is the representative body of students at the University of Galway in Ireland. Among its former leaders is Michael D. Higgins, the ninth President of Ireland.

Functions and objectives
The University of Galway Students' Union is a representative student body. Every student who registers at the University of Galway automatically becomes a member of the Students' Union on payment of a student levy. The union is separated into two entities - the Students' Union Representative side and the Students' Union Commercial Services Ltd.

As outlined in the Students' Union (SU) constitution, the function of the union is to "represent its members and promote, defend and vindicate the rights of its members at all levels of society".
The Students' Union sits on several University committees, including the University Governing Authority. The union's objectives include providing social, recreational and commercial services for members through the College Bar, entertainment events, the SU shop and other commercial services. The union also part funds Sin Newspaper and Flirt FM.

On a national level, the Union pursues "fair and equal access to education for all sectors of the Irish people", and liaises with the Union of Students in Ireland in this goal. Work of the union has included the organising of a grant information evening to help students apply for local authority grants.

Executive committee
While the president, along with the staff, is mainly responsible for the day-to-day running of the union, the Students' Union Executive is the committee that runs the union on an ongoing basis. It consists of fifteen elected members, whose responsibilities cover different student concerns - from educational issues to accommodation and discrimination. Of the fifteen members of the Executive, four are paid sabbatical (full-time) Officers, i.e. the president and three vice-presidents, while the other twelve officers work on a part-time, unpaid basis.

Students elect their Students' Union officers. The term of office is from 1 July to 30 June of the following year. To be eligible to run for election, candidates must be a full member of the Students' Union, i.e. a registered student or current Executive Officer, and receive 20 nominations. Candidates require three nominators who must be full members of the union and Club Captains (where the position sought is Clubs' Captain) or Society Auditors (where the position is Societies' Chairperson).

History
Though a Students' Representative Council was established in 1911, this council was short-lived. The re-establishment of the body was proposed in the auditor's inaugural address in November 1913. The council was firmly established by the mid-1920s, and in the 1960s was formally developed into the university's Students' Union, then known as Comhairle Teachta na Mac Léinn. The non-existence of society records from that period makes this contention impossible to prove.

Restructured in 1964 in the Students' Union (although retaining the Irish Comhairle Teacha na Mac Léinn until later years), the function of the union as per the constitution is to "to represent its members and promote, defend and vindicate the rights of its members at all levels of society".  Below are some highlights from the Unions past.

1964 •	Led by Michael D. Higgins 600 students marched to protest about "poor relations generally between the University and the local community" as many hotels refused to take visiting students and landladies discriminated against students in summer.
1969 •	College Week (RAG Week) run for the first time after being banned by the Bishop in the 1950s.
2008 •	Fees campaign begins with thousands marching to Eyre Square
2009 •	The Union organised and attended several fees-related protests and ran a campaign encouraging students to "Adopt a TD"
2014 •	The Union joins the international Boycott, Divestment and Sanctions policy against the State of Israel after a referendum of members tabled by the NUI Galway Palestine Solidarity Society. Members also vote to retain the Union's pro-choice position on abortion after an attempt to repeal the previous year's vote was tabled to students by the NUI Galway Life Society.
2022 •	The Union established the role of a full time Irish Language Officer by referendum.

References

External links
 University of Galway Students' Union Site
 University of Galway Site

Students' unions in Ireland
University of Galway